The Wadi Khanzir is a tributary of the upper Khabur River in northeastern Syria.

References

Khanzir
Tributaries of the Khabur (Euphrates)